Nadia Bukhari is a British pharmacist of Pakistani origin living in London, United Kingdom. In 2018, she was awarded the status of Fellow of the Royal Pharmaceutical Society (RPS) making her the youngest female fellow under the Royal Pharmaceutical Society of Great Britain; an honor bestowed to those who have achieved excellence and distinction in their pharmacy career. In addition, she is the first Muslim female and British Pakistani to be a board member of the National Association of Boards of Pharmacy for England, UK. Since 2003, she has been serving in academia at University College London (UCL). She wrote and published many articles on the pharmacy and leadership field at Pharmaceutical Press and BMC Series. In Pakistan, she received the honor to launch the National Alliance for Women in Pharmacy (NAWP) under the Pakistan Pharmacists Association (PPA). She is the global lead at the International Pharmaceutical Federation (FIP) to promote gender equity in the pharmaceutical industry. Also, she has been serving as a trustee and an ambassador for the Pakistan Alliance for Girls Education (PAGE); a charity program supported by the Government of Pakistan. She is also an executive committee member at Indus Health Network UK. In 2021, she launched Equity Pakistan, and is the UK director of the initiative; a gender equity hub for the pharmaceutical workforce in Pakistan; a collaborated initiative taken by Hamdard University Islamabad Campus and University College London (UCL). She was the chief pharmacist at doctHERs; a telemedicine company in Pakistan enabling home-based healthcare females to work in the pharmaceutical industry and connect with low-income patients across Pakistan. Following her departure from doctHERs, Nadia has co-founded ‘Siha Health & Wellness’ and is the Chief Operating Officer. Siha provides one-stop health and wellness solutions for the corporate sector in Pakistan.

Personal life 
She is a British Pakistani born in a Muslim family living in London, United Kingdom. She is raised in London and studied pharmacy from her early age. She has roots in Karachi, while she is well connected with the renowned Faqir family living in Lahore through her marriage with Faqir Syed Murtaza Bukhari.

Education 
Bukhari graduated from the School of Pharmacy, the University of London in 1999. She received her postgraduate diploma as a pharmacist in the year 2006. Later in 2008, she did a postgraduate diploma in teaching & learning for higher education from the Institute of Education, University of London. In 2011, she studied professional counseling from Oxford College while for further pharmacy education from Higher Education Academy, London. Around 2012, she enrolled in Ph.D. focusing on the leadership and pharmacy field.

Career
In 2000, Bukhari started her professional career as a pharmacy manager at Westbury Chemist in Streatham, UK. After a year, she moved to work for Bart's and the London NHS Trust, London as a clinical pharmacist for the surgical and musculoskeletal directorate. In 2003, she began to work in academia at University College London (UCL) as an academic facilitator, teaching fellow, and pre-registration coordinator; her area of research is pharmacy and leadership. Since 2003, she has published various titles in the Pharmaceutical Press and BMC Series. Later in 2014, she became a senior teaching fellow in the same university. She had also joined the Royal Pharmaceutical Society of Great Britain for a year. In 2015, Bukhari was awarded the status of Fellow of the Royal Pharmaceutical Society (RPS) for her excellence and contributions towards the profession of pharmacy. In the same year, she co-hosted an event at RPS to talk about women in a leadership role. In 2016, she was invited by the South African Pharmacy Council (SAPC) to speak about the UK pharmaceutical practices. Since 2017, Bukhari has also been an advisor to the Commonwealth Pharmacists Association and British Islamic Medical Association. In addition, she has been mentoring students globally. Later in the year 2017, she became the youngest female, an Asian Muslim and a British Pakistani to be elected as the board member at English National Pharmacy Board, UK. In the same year, she began to serve as an ambassador for the Pakistan Alliance for Girls Education (PAGE); an initiative taken by the support of the Government of Pakistan to promote girls' education across the country. In 2018, she was appointed to be the Principal Teaching Fellow at UCL School of Pharmacy. In the same year, she participated in Pharmaceutical Care Conference  and represented UCL on the invitation by the Ministry of Health (MOH) in Oman. In 2019, she became the global lead of gender equity at the International Pharmaceutical Federation (FIP), a trustee of Pakistan Alliance for Girls Education (PAGE) and stepped down from the responsibilities of the National Pharmacy Board, UK. In the same year, she also launched National Alliance for Women in Pharmacy (NAWP) under Pakistan Pharmacists Association (PPA) to support opportunities for female pharmacists across Pakistan. In 2019, She has received the honor to represent the Pakistani community in an event arranged by the Royal Household of the United Kingdom at Aga Khan Centre in London. In the same year, she was invited by Hamdard University Islamabad Campus and other leading academic institutes to multiple events as a guest speaker to share her experience, promote gender equity, and leadership roles in the pharmaceutical industry of Pakistan. In 2020, she joined Indus Health Network UK as an executive committee member and became part of the charitable programs conducted by the hospital.  Also, she joined doctHERs as the Chief Pharmacist; a tech-enabled pharmacy and healthcare consultancy service in Pakistan for underserved patients. In 2021, she started to work as the director of Equity Pakistan, an initiative that can address the lack of gender diversity in the pharmaceutical industry and perform necessary activities to create a gender balance in the field. It is launched under the collaboration of University College London (UCL) and Hamdard University Islamabad Campus in Islamabad, Pakistan.

Philanthropy
Bukhari has been working for charitable programs, reducing the gender gap, and other philanthropy projects. The prominent projects are following:
In 2017, she began to serve as a trustee and an ambassador for the Pakistan Alliance for Girls Education (PAGE) to reduce the gender gap and increase access to education for all females across Pakistan.
 In 2019, she became the global lead at International Pharmaceutical Federation (FIP) to advocate for gender equity in the workforce of the pharmaceutical industry. 
In 2019, while serving as an ambassador for the Pakistan Alliance for Girls Education (PAGE), she also became its trustee to support female education across Pakistan.
In 2019, she launched the National Alliance for Women in Pharmacy (NAWP) under Pakistan Pharmacists Association (PPA) to provide opportunities for females pharmacists in the health industry across Pakistan. 
 In 2020, she joined Indus Health Network UK as an executive committee member to advocate and raise funds for the charity programs of the hospital. 
In 2020, she began to work as the chief pharmacist at doctHERs; a telemedicine company connecting home-based and underutilized female healthcare workers to serve low-income patients remotely through technology. Under Bukhari's leadership role, they have launched projects in the rural areas of Pakistan where the community health workers, like Guddi Bajis, are selling the medicines to underserved patients under the supervision of telehealthcare workers of doctHERs.
In 2021, she became the Director of Equity Pakistan; a gender equity hub created to address the issues related to gender inequities in the pharmaceutical workforce of Pakistan.

Media coverage
Bukhari has been invited by the media on multiple occasions to speak about the role and challenges faced by the healthcare workers, prominently by pharmacists, in the health industry. The following are the prominent media coverage:
She educated the public on the role of pharmacists, particularly minority groups, through a TV series on the Islam Channel called ‘Health is Wealth’; a Ramadan initiative project by British Islamic Medical Association.
 Her achievements were highlighted by UK 44; a Pakistani news channel for the Asian community residing in the United Kingdom. 
She was interviewed by BBC Asian Network's Nihal Show and Geo News. And also, by famous magazines like OK Pakistan, Hello Pakistan, and Scientia Pakistan to speak about her efforts and achievements in the healthcare industry.
 During the year 2020, she was invited by PTV News, 24 News HD, Dawn News, and other leading channels to speak about the role and importance of healthcare workers during the pandemic.
 In 2021, she was interviewed by Dr. Nazish Affan on UrduPoint, a digital media network, to discuss the effects of the vaccine developed for the Coronavirus.

Honors and awards 
Bukhari received the following honors and awards throughout her career:

 She gained the Fellowship of the HEA in 2011.
She was a member of the winning team for 'Training & Development' at C+D Awards 2015.
 She was shortlisted for the ‘Outstanding Teaching Award 2015’ at UCL.
 She received the honor of being the youngest Asian Muslim female Fellow by the Royal Pharmaceutical Society (RPS) in 2015.
 She is the first Muslim female and British Pakistani to be a board member of the National Association of Boards of Pharmacy for England in 2017.
 She has been titled as the ‘UCL Global Pharmacy Ambassador’ for her global advocacy work and nominated for the Provost's Global Engagement Awards 2018.

See also 

 Royal Pharmaceutical Society (RPS)
 Royal Pharmaceutical Society of Great Britain
 National Association of Boards of Pharmacy
 University College London (UCL)
 Royal Household of the United Kingdom
 Pakistan Pharmacists Association (PPA)
 Government of Pakistan
 Pharmaceutical Press
 BMC Series

References

External links 

 
 Profile of Nadia Bukhari at UCL

Year of birth missing (living people)
Living people
British pharmacists
British people of Pakistani descent
Women pharmacists